Wales Island is an island on the North Coast of British Columbia, Canada, situated east of the Dixon Entrance at the entrance to Portland Inlet.

Wales Island is bounded on the north by the Pearse Canal and Wales Passage, and by Tongass Passage and Portland Inlet to the south. Within Canada, Pearse Island lies to the northeast.

In August 1793, during his exploration of the west coast of North America in HMS Discovery, Captain George Vancouver named Wales Point, at the entrance to Portland Inlet, after William Wales, master of the Royal Mathematical School at Christ's Hospital, London. At the time, George Vancouver was a young midshipman, and William Wales was the ship's astronomer. Vancouver later credited Wales with teaching him the necessary navigational skills which enabled his own explorations of the Pacific region in the early 1790s. Vancouver also accompanied Captain Cook on his third and final voyage, 1776–79.

In 1871, an official at the British Hydrographic Office named Wales Island in association with the point of land named 78 years earlier by Captain Vancouver.

History 

For an obscure island in a remote corner of the B.C. coast, Wales Island was to play a pivotal role in the often contentious Alaska Boundary Dispute between Canada and the United States. This dispute had its roots in the 1825 treaty signed by Russia and Great Britain, which attempted to define, in principle more than fact, the boundary that lay between Alaska and what was then the west coast of British North America. Included in the terms of this treaty was the stipulation that the southernmost boundary of Alaskan territory would advance northwards through Portland Canal to the 56th parallel north. This demarcation was claimed to have placed Wales Island firmly in Alaskan territory.

There the matter lay until Russia sold Alaska to the United States in 1867, and British Columbia became a province of Canada four years later, in 1871. Between this period and the final settlement of the boundary question in 1903, survey crews from both Canada and the United States actively explored, mapped and charted the high mountains, deep fjords, glaciers and bogland of this rugged terrain, often in collaboration. In 1896, the military intervened in the form of the United States Army Corps of Engineers, which constructed four stone houses in the Portland Canal area. This was done to strengthen America's claim to the Canal as the southernmost boundary of Alaska. One of these sturdy structures was built on the south shore of Wales Island, while another, on the border between Stewart, BC and Hyder, Alaska, can still be seen today.

Two years later, the potential mineral wealth of the far north, as revealed by the Klondike Gold Rush of 1898, convinced both Canada and the United States that a new Alaska boundary treaty was urgently required.

This renewed interest in the region led eventually to the signing of the Hay-Herbert Treaty in January, 1903. The terms of the treaty provided for a tribunal to settle the boundary question in precise geographical language. Thus, over the next several months, the Alaska Boundary Tribunal, with Canadian, American and British representatives, duly measured, mapped and deliberated, before delivering its award in October of that year. Among the many consequences of this final demarcation of the boundaries of the Alaskan Panhandle was the result that Wales Island now belonged to British Columbia.

In 1902, while Wales Island was still claimed to be in U.S. territory, a salmon cannery was built on the east shore of Pearse Canal, on the north-west side of the island. But as a result of the 1903 Tribunal Award, the American owners of the cannery forfeited possession of their facility, which by then had produced more than 3500 cases of canned salmon.

At the same time, Hidden Inlet Cannery, situated  further north on the west shore of Pearse Canal, had suffered a reverse fate, and was now in Alaskan territory. In 1910, Merrill DesBrisay, the former Canadian owner of Hidden Inlet Cannery purchased Wales Island Cannery and rebuilt it. For the next 14 years, DesBrisay and Company operated the plant before selling to the Canadian Fishing Company in 1925. Wales Island Cannery had its peak production of 50,000 cases of salmon in the 1924 season. It produced its final pack of 26,000 cases in 1949, the last of eleven canneries to operate in the Nass River-Portland Canal area. For several years thereafter, the plant functioned as a summer gillnet station before being abandoned in the late 1950s. Today, a fly-in fishing lodge (Eagle Pointe) occupies the site of the former Wales Island Cannery.

Coda: In 1936, the U.S. Congress granted $100,000 to the former American owners of Wales Island Cannery, as compensation for the loss of their property 33 years earlier.

Ecology 

Wales Island lies on the northern edge of the Hecate Lowland Ecosection, a once heavily glaciated band of narrow lowland rain forest and coastal archipelago that stretches from Portland Inlet in the north to Queen Charlotte Strait in the south. Hecate Lowland terrain is generally rough and rocky, with wide areas of muskeg wetland and bog forest. Tree species include western red cedar, yellow cedar, mountain hemlock and fir. Salal, ferns, berry bush and skunk cabbage are commonly found undergrowth. Lowland climate in the Wales Island region is dominated by frontal flows from Dixon Entrance, resulting in frequent wind storms and heavy rainfall.

Species include murre, grebe, murrelet, gull, tern, loon, auklet, petrel and eagle. The island's topography affords a profusion of breeding and nesting habitat for a wide variety of seabirds, and is an integral component of the Pacific coast migratory flyway.

References 

 Blyth, Gladys Young. Salmon Canneries, North Pacific Coast, Oolichan Books, Lantzville, B.C., 1991.
 Blyth, Gladys Young. A History of Wales Island, B.C. and Eagle Pointe Lodge. Privately printed monograph
 SS Cardena, Ship's Pilot House Logbooks (1933–1947). Provincial Archives of British Columbia. Victoria
 
 British Columbia Ministry of Environment, Skeena Region, Hecate Lowland Ecosection Summary.

External links
 Wales Island Cannery

Uninhabited islands of British Columbia
History of British Columbia
Pre-statehood history of Alaska
North Coast of British Columbia
Nisga'a
Canada–United States border disputes